Ma Ning was a Chinese general who served as Commander of the People's Liberation Army Air Force.

Ma Ning may also refer to:

Ma Ning (referee) (born 1979), Chinese football referee
Ma Ning (javelin thrower) (born 1983), Chinese javelin thrower
Ma Ning (field hockey), Chinese field hockey player